Bingham v. Cabot, 3 U.S. (3 Dall.) 382 (1798), was a United States Supreme Court case involving the Cabot family, a wealthy Yankee shipping family from New England. It was the second such case following the 1795 Bingham v. Cabot case. In the case the Court held that in diversity suits in federal courts, a party must allege appropriate citizenship and not simply residence, otherwise it may be stricken from the docket.

See also 
 Bingham v. Cabot (1795)

References

External links
 

United States Supreme Court cases
United States Supreme Court cases of the Ellsworth Court
1798 in United States case law